Gaelic medium education may refer to:

Gaelic-medium education in Ireland
Gaelic-medium education on the Isle of Man
Gaelic-medium education in Scotland